Bruce Gordon (1878 – 18 April 1960) was a Cape Colony cricketer. He played in seven first-class matches for Border from 1897/98 to 1903/04.

See also
 List of Border representative cricketers

References

External links
 

1878 births
1960 deaths
Cricketers from Cape Colony
Border cricketers